Miengo is a municipality in Cantabria, Spain.

Geography 
Miengo is situated in the central coast of Cantabria, between the Ría de San Martín de la Arena and the Ría de Mogro. Miengo has five beaches: Cuchía, Los Caballos, Usgo, Robayera and Usil; and two "calas": Las Monedas y El Huevo Frito.
The natural limits of Miengo are the river Pas (east), the Ria de San Martin de la Arena (east) and the Cantabric sea (north). Miengo has border with the municipalities of Polanco, Pielagos, Liencres and Suances.

Population 
Miengo has 4.540 in six villages:

 Bárcena de Cudón, 302.
 Cuchía, 745.
 Cudón, 532.
 Gornazo, 136.
 Miengo (Capital), 1.329.
 Mogro, 1.396.

Government 

Avelino Cuartas (People's Party) is the actual mayor of Miengo, since 1995.

Economy 

6,1% of the population of Miengo works in agriculture, 38,5% works in industry and 55,4% works in services. The unemployment rate is 11,4%.

References 

Municipalities in Cantabria